Haidai or Gaidai, also transliterated  Hayday and Gayday, is a surname. Notable people with the surname include:

 Leonid Gaidai (1923–1993), Soviet film director
 Serhiy Haidai (born 1975), Ukrainian politician
 Zoia Gaidai (1902–1965), Ukrainian opera singer

See also
 
 

Ukrainian-language surnames